Early Modern English (sometimes abbreviated EModE, or EMnE) or Early New English  (ENE) is the stage of the English language from the beginning of the Tudor period to the English Interregnum and Restoration, or from the transition from Middle English, in the late 15th century, to the transition to Modern English, in the mid-to-late 17th century.

Before and after the accession of James I to the English throne in 1603, the emerging English standard began to influence the spoken and written Middle Scots of Scotland.

The grammatical and orthographical conventions of literary English in the late 16th century and the 17th century are still very influential on modern Standard English. Most modern readers of English can understand texts written in the late phase of Early Modern English, such as the King James Bible and the works of William Shakespeare, and they have greatly influenced Modern English.

Texts from the earlier phase of Early Modern English, such as the late-15th-century Le Morte d'Arthur (1485) and the mid-16th-century Gorboduc (1561), may present more difficulties but are still closer to Modern English grammar, lexicon and phonology than are 14th-century Middle English texts, such as the works of Geoffrey Chaucer.

History

English Renaissance

Transition from Middle English

The change from Middle English to Early Modern English was not just a matter of changes of vocabulary or pronunciation; a new era in the history of English was beginning.

An era of linguistic change in a language with large variations in dialect was replaced by a new era of a more standardised language, with a richer lexicon and an established (and lasting) literature.
1476 – William Caxton started printing in Westminster; however, the language that he used reflected the variety of styles and dialects used by the authors who originally wrote the material.

Tudor period (1485–1603)

1485 – Caxton published Thomas Malory's Le Morte d'Arthur, the first print bestseller in English. Malory's language, while archaic in some respects, was clearly Early Modern and was possibly a Yorkshire or Midlands dialect.
1491 or 1492 – Richard Pynson started printing in London; his style tended to prefer Chancery Standard, the form of English used by the government.

Henry VIII
 1509 – Pynson became the king's official printer.
From 1525 – Publication of William Tyndale's Bible translation, which was initially banned.
1539 – Publication of the Great Bible, the first officially authorised Bible in English. Edited by Myles Coverdale, it was largely from the work of Tyndale. It was read to congregations regularly in churches, which familiarised much of the population of England with a standard form of the language.
1549 – Publication of the first Book of Common Prayer in English, under the supervision of Thomas Cranmer (revised 1552 and 1662), which standardised much of the wording of church services. Some have argued that since attendance at prayer book services was required by law for many years, the repetitive use of its language helped to standardise Modern English even more than the King James Bible (1611) did.
1557 – Publication of Tottel's Miscellany.

Elizabethan English

Elizabethan era (1558–1603)
1582 – The Rheims and Douai Bible was completed, and the New Testament was released in Rheims, France, in 1582. It was the first complete English translation of the Bible that was officially sponsored and carried out by the Catholic Church (earlier translations into English, especially of the Psalms and Gospels existed as far back as the 9th century, but it was the first Catholic English translation of the full Bible). Though the Old Testament was already complete, it was not published until 1609–1610, when it was released in two volumes. While it did not make a large impact on the English language at large, it certainly played a role in the development of English, especially in heavily Catholic English-speaking areas.
Christopher Marlowe, 
1592 – The Spanish Tragedy by Thomas Kyd
c. 1590 to c. 1612 – Shakespeare's plays written

17th century

Jacobean and Caroline eras

Jacobean era (1603–1625)

1609 – Shakespeare's sonnets published
Other playwrights:
Ben Jonson
Thomas Dekker
Beaumont and Fletcher (Francis Beaumont and John Fletcher)
John Webster
1607 – The first successful permanent English colony in the New World, Jamestown, is established in Virginia. Early vocabulary specific to American English comes from indigenous languages (such as moose, racoon).
1611 – The King James Version was published, largely based on Tyndale's translation. It remained the standard Bible in the Church of England into the twentieth century.
1623 – Shakespeare's First Folio published

Caroline era and English Civil War (1625–1649)

1630–1651 – William Bradford, Governor of Plymouth Colony, wrote his journal. It will become Of Plymouth Plantation, one of the earliest texts written in the American Colonies.
1647 – Publication of the first Beaumont and Fletcher folio

Interregnum and Restoration
The English Civil War and the Interregnum were times of social and political upheaval and instability.
The dates for Restoration literature are a matter of convention and differ markedly from genre to genre. In drama, the "Restoration" may last until 1700, but in poetry, it may last only until 1666, the annus mirabilis (year of wonders), and in prose lasts until 1688. With the increasing tensions over succession and the corresponding rise in journalism and periodicals, or until possibly 1700, when those periodicals grew more stabilised.
1651 – Publication of Leviathan by Thomas Hobbes.
1660–1669 – Samuel Pepys wrote his diary, which will become an important eyewitness account of the Restoration Era.
1662 – New edition of the Book of Common Prayer, largely based on the 1549 and subsequent editions. It long remained a standard work in English.
1667 – Publication of Paradise Lost by John Milton and of Annus Mirabilis by John Dryden

Development to Modern English

The 17th-century port towns and their forms of speech gained influence over the old county towns. From around the 1690s onwards, England experienced a new period of internal peace and relative stability, which encouraged the arts including literature.

Modern English can be taken to have emerged fully by the beginning of the Georgian era in 1714, but English orthography remained somewhat fluid until the publication of Johnson's A Dictionary of the English Language, in 1755.

The towering importance of William Shakespeare over the other Elizabethan authors was the result of his reception during the 17th and the 18th centuries, which directly contributes to the development of Standard English. Shakespeare's plays are therefore still familiar and comprehensible 400 years after they were written, but the works of Geoffrey Chaucer and William Langland, which had been written only 200 years earlier, are considerably more difficult for the average modern reader.

Orthography

The orthography of Early Modern English was fairly similar to that of today, but spelling was unstable. Early Modern English, as well as Modern English, inherited orthographical conventions predating the Great Vowel Shift.

Early Modern English spelling was similar to Middle English orthography. Certain changes were made, however, sometimes for reasons of etymology (as with the silent  that was added to words like ,  and ).

Early Modern English orthography had a number of features of spelling that have not been retained:
The short s was always used at the end of a word and often elsewhere. The long s, if used, could appear anywhere except at the end of a word. That is similar to the alternation between medial (σ) and final lowercase sigma (ς) in Greek.
The letter  (thorn) was still in use during the Early Modern English period but was increasingly limited to handwritten texts. In Early Modern English printing,  was represented by the Latin  (see Ye olde), which appeared similar to thorn in blackletter typeface . Thorn had become nearly totally disused by the late Early Modern English period, the last vestiges of the letter being its ligatures,  (thee),  (that),  (thou), which were still seen occasionally in the 1611 King James Version and in Shakespeare's Folios.
The sound  was often written  (as in son): hence ,  (for modern summer, plumb).
The final syllable of words like public was variously spelt but came to be standardised as -ick. The modern spellings with -ic did not come into use until the mid-18th century.

Many spellings had still not been standardised, however.

Phonology

Consonants
Most consonant sounds of Early Modern English have survived into present-day English; however, there are still a few notable differences in pronunciation:
Today's "silent" consonants found in the consonant clusters of such words as knot, gnat, sword were still fully pronounced up until the mid-to-late 16th century and thus possibly by Shakespeare, though they were fully reduced by the early 17th century. It seems likely that much variation existed for many of these words.
The now-silent l of would and should may have persisted in being pronounced as late as 1700 in Britain and perhaps several decades longer in the British American colonies. The l in could, however, first appearing in the early 16th century, was presumably never pronounced.
The modern phoneme  was not documented as occurring until the second half of the 17th century.
That means, for example, that wine and whine were still pronounced differently, unlike in most varieties of English today.
Early Modern English was rhotic. In other words, the r was always pronounced, but the precise nature of the typical rhotic consonant remains unclear.  It was, however, certainly one of the following:
The "R" of most varieties of English today:  or a further forward sound 
The "trilled or rolled R": , perhaps with one contact , as in modern Scouse and Scottish English
The "retroflex R": . 
Word-final , as in sing, was still pronounced  until the late 16th century, when it began to coalesce into the usual modern pronunciation, . The original pronunciation  is preserved in parts of England, in dialects such as Brummie, Mancunian and Scouse.
H-dropping at the start of words was common, as it still is in informal English throughout most of England. In loanwords taken from Latin, Greek, or any Romance language, a written h was usually mute well into modern English times, e.g. in heritage, history, hermit, hostage, and still today in heir, honor, hour etc.
With words originating from or passed through ancient Greek, th was commonly pronounced as t, e.g. theme, theater, cathedral, anthem; this is still retained in some proper names as Thomas and a few common nouns like thyme.

Pure vowels and diphthongs
The following information primarily comes from studies of the Great Vowel Shift; see the related chart.
Early Modern rhymes indicate that  was also the vowel that was used at the end of words like happy, melody and busy.
, as in fed, elm and hen, was more or less the same as the phoneme represents today, sometimes approaching  (as it still retains in the word pretty).
 , as in name, case and sake, was a long monophthong. Earlier in Early Modern English, mat and mate were near-homophones, with a longer vowel in the second word. Thus, Shakespeare rhymed words like haste, taste and waste with last and shade with sad. The more open pronunciation remains in some Northern England English and perhaps Ireland. During the 17th century, the phoneme variably merged with the phoneme  as in day, weigh, and the merger survived into standard forms of Modern English, though a few dialects kept these vowels distinct at least to the 20th century (see pane–pain merger).
However, words like breath, dead and head may have already split off towards ).
, as in bib, pin and thick, was more or less the same as the phoneme represents today.
The phoneme was probably just beginning the process of merging with the phoneme , as in grow, know and mow, without yet achieving today's complete merger. The old pronunciation remains in some dialects, such as in Yorkshire and Scotland.
, as in boy, choice and toy, is even less clear than other vowels. By the late 16th century, the similar but distinct phonemes ,  and  all existed. By the late 17th century, they all merged.
 occurred not only in words like food, moon and stool, but also all other words spelled with  like blood, cook and foot. The nature of the vowel sound in the latter group of words, however, is further complicated by the fact that the vowel for some of those words was shortened: either beginning or already in the process of approximating the Early Modern English  and later . For instance, at certain stages of the Early Modern period or in certain dialects (or both), doom and come rhymed; this is certainly true in Shakespeare's writing. That phonological split among the  words was a catalyst for the later foot–strut split and is called "early shortening" by John C. Wells. The  words that were pronounced as something like  seem to have included blood, brood, doom, good and noon.
 or  occurred in words spelled with ew or ue such as due and dew. There is, however, an additional complication in dialects with yod-coalescence (such as Australian English and younger RP), in which dew and due  (homophonous with jew) are distinguished from do  purely by the initial consonant, without any vowel distinction.

The precise EME realizations are not known and they vary even in modern English.

Rhotic vowels
The r sound (the phoneme ) was probably always pronounced with following vowel sounds (more in the style of today's General American, West Country English, Irish accents and Scottish accents; although in the case of the Scottish accent the R is rolled, and less like the pronunciation now usual in most of England.

In London English they gradually merged into a phoneme that became modern . With the spelling , the sound may have been backed, more toward  in words like worth and word.

See  for more information.

Particular words
One may have been pronounced own, with both one and other using the era's long  vowel, rather than today's  vowels. Tongue derived from the sound of tong and rhymed with song.

Grammar

Pronouns
Early Modern English had two second-person personal pronouns: thou, the informal singular pronoun, and ye, the plural (both formal and informal) pronoun and the formal singular pronoun.

"Thou" and "ye" were both common in the early 16th century (they can be seen, for example, in the disputes over Tyndale's translation of the Bible in the 1520s and the 1530s) but by 1650, "thou" seems old-fashioned or literary. It has effectively completely disappeared from Modern Standard English.

The translators of the King James Version of the Bible (begun 1604 and published 1611, while Shakespeare was at the height of his popularity) had a particular reason for keeping the informal "thou/thee/thy/thine" forms that were slowly beginning to fall out of spoken use, as it enabled them to match the Hebrew and Ancient Greek distinction between second person singular ("thou") and plural ("ye"). It was not to denote reverence (in the King James Version, God addresses individual people and even Satan as "thou") but only to denote the singular. Over the centuries, however, the very fact that "thou" was dropping out of normal use gave it a special aura and so it gradually and ironically came to be used to express reverence in hymns and in prayers.

Like other personal pronouns, thou and ye have different forms dependent on their grammatical case; specifically, the objective form of thou is thee, its possessive forms are thy and thine, and its reflexive or emphatic form is thyself.

The objective form of ye was you, its possessive forms are your and yours and its reflexive or emphatic forms are yourself and yourselves.

The older forms "mine" and "thine" had become "my" and "thy" before words beginning with a consonant other than h, and "mine" and "thine" were retained before words beginning with a vowel or an h, as in mine eyes or thine hand.

Verbs

Tense and number
During the Early Modern period, the verb inflections became simplified as they evolved towards their modern forms:
The third-person singular present lost its alternate inflections: -eth and -th became obsolete, and -s survived. (Both forms can be seen together in Shakespeare: "With her, that hateth thee and hates us all".)
The plural present form became uninflected. Present plurals had been marked with -en and singulars with -th or -s (-th and -s survived the longest, especially with the singular use of is, hath and doth). Marked present plurals were rare throughout the Early Modern period and -en was probably used only as a stylistic affectation to indicate rural or old-fashioned speech.
The second-person singular indicative was marked in both the present and past tenses with -st or -est (for example, in the past tense, walkedst or gav'st). Since the indicative past was not and still is not otherwise marked for person or number, the loss of thou made the past subjunctive indistinguishable from the indicative past for all verbs except to be.

Modal auxiliaries
The modal auxiliaries cemented their distinctive syntactical characteristics during the Early Modern period. Thus, the use of modals without an infinitive became rare (as in "I must to Coventry"; "I'll none of that"). The use of modals' present participles to indicate aspect (as in "Maeyinge suffer no more the loue & deathe of Aurelio" from 1556), and of their preterite forms to indicate tense (as in "he follow'd Horace so very close, that of necessity he must fall with him") also became uncommon.

Some verbs ceased to function as modals during the Early Modern period. The present form of must, mot, became obsolete. Dare also lost the syntactical characteristics of a modal auxiliary and evolved a new past form (dared), distinct from the modal durst.

Perfect and progressive forms
The perfect of the verbs had not yet been standardised to use only the auxiliary verb "to have". Some took as their auxiliary verb "to be", such as this example from the King James Version: "But which of you... will say unto him... when he is come from the field, Go and sit down..." [Luke XVII:7]. The rules for the auxiliaries for different verbs were similar to those that are still observed in German and French (see unaccusative verb).

The modern syntax used for the progressive aspect ("I am walking") became dominant by the end of the Early Modern period, but other forms were also common such as the prefix a- ("I am a-walking") and the infinitive paired with "do" ("I do walk"). Moreover, the to be + -ing verb form could be used to express a passive meaning without any additional markers: "The house is building" could mean "The house is being built".

Vocabulary
A number of words that are still in common use in Modern English have undergone semantic narrowing.

The use of the verb "to suffer" in the sense of "to allow" survived into Early Modern English, as in the phrase "suffer the little children" of the King James Version, but it has mostly been lost in Modern English. This use still exists in the idiom "to suffer fools gladly".

Also, this period reveals a curious case of one of the earliest Russian borrowings to English (which is historically a rare occasion itself); at least as early as 1600, the word "steppe" (rus. степь) first appeared in English in William Shakespeare's comedy A Midsummer Night's Dream. It is believed that this is a possible indirect borrowing via either German or French.

The substantial borrowing of Latin and sometimes Greek words for abstract concepts, begun in Middle English, continued unabated, often terms for abstract concepts not available in English.

See also
Early modern Britain
English literature
History of English
Inkhorn term
Elizabethan era, Jacobean era, Caroline era
English Renaissance
Shakespeare's influence
Middle English, Modern English, Old English

References

External links
 English Paleography: Examples for the study of English handwriting from the 16th–18th centuries from the Beinecke Rare Book and Manuscript Library at Yale University

 
History of the English language
English
Languages attested from the 15th century
15th-century establishments in Europe
Languages extinct in the 17th century
17th-century disestablishments in Europe